Roc Llop i Convalia (31 December 1908 in Miravet – 15 August 1997 in Paris) was a Catalan anarchist, teacher and poet. He was a member of CNT.

He trained to be a teacher in Tarragona and worked in Vallfogona de Riucorb. He moved to France during his exile after the Spanish Civil War where he wrote for the publication Terra Lliure. He was also in a nazi concentration camp in Gusen-Mauthausen for five years.

Works 
Poemes de llum i tenebra. Choisy-le-Roi: Imprimerie des Gondoles, 1967
Mission ratée de l'home sur terre
Contes negres de les vores del Danubi
Mission Ratée de l'Home sur Terre, 1979.
Tríptic de l'amor i proses. Choisy-le-Roi: Imprimerie des Gondoles, 1986

External links 
 Gran Enciclopèdia Catalana: Roc Llop i Convalia
 Bloc del centenari Roc Llop i Convalia

1908 births
1997 deaths
Writers from Catalonia
Anarchists from Catalonia
Spanish expatriates in France